The Pointe Béhague or Pointe Coumarouman or even Ponta de Cumarumã (in Portuguese) is a cape in north-east French Guiana, lying between the mouths of Approuague and Oiapoque rivers. It is located in the commune of Ouanary

References

Landforms of French Guiana